Reno Browne was the stage name of Josephine Ruth Clarke (April 20, 1921 – May 15, 1991), an American equestrian and B-movie actress during the late 1940s and into the 1950s, with most of her films being in 1949. She was sometimes billed as Reno Blair.

Early life 
She was born  in Reno, Nevada, to wealthy parents. Her father was a successful attorney. 

Browne graduated from a Dominican convent in San Rafael in 1941.

Career
Browne became a licensed pilot. She was proficient at riding horses. After taking drama lessons, she embarked on a film career, signing a contract with Monogram Pictures. 

She starred with Whip Wilson in the 1949 western Haunted Trails, and that same year started a thirteen-episode radio show, Reno Rides Again. Also in 1949, she starred in West of El Dorado with Max Terhune and Johnny Mack Brown.

In total, she starred in fourteen westerns of the period, at times with Roy Rogers and Jimmy Wakely.

She and Dale Evans were the only westerns actresses to have their own comic books based on their character. Browne had four issues published in 1950 by Marvel Comics. In 1950, Bill Haley and His Saddlemen recorded a single, "My Palomino and I"/"My Sweet Little Girl from Nevada", for Cowboy Records (CR 1701). It was released as by "Reno Browne and Her Buckaroos", even though Browne had no connection with the recording (though her photo did appear on the sheet music for the latter song). Also in 1951, she was crowned Clovis Rodeo Queen in Clovis, California.

Personal life
For a period, she was married to western actor Lash LaRue. She retired to Reno, and during the 1980s she attended several western film festivals.

Death
Browne was diagnosed with cancer, and died in Physicians' Hospital for Extended Care in Reno on May 15, 1991.

Selected filmography
 The Law Comes to Gunsight (1947)
 Raiders of the South (1947)
 Frontier Agent (1948)
 Across the Rio Grande (1949)
 Haunted Trails (1949)
 Shadows of the West (1949)
 Range Land (1949)
 Red Rock Outlaw (1949)
 Gunslingers (1950)

References

External links

Reno Browne/Blair at b-westerns.com

Actresses from Reno, Nevada
Actresses from Nevada
American film actresses
1921 births
1991 deaths
20th-century American actresses